Tyler Lawlor (born October 11, 1972 in Sudbury, Ontario) is a Canadian slalom canoer who competed in the late 1990s and the early 2000s. He finished ninth in the C-2 event at the 2000 Summer Olympics in Sydney.

References
Sports-Reference.com profile

1972 births
Canadian male canoeists
Canoeists at the 2000 Summer Olympics
Living people
Olympic canoeists of Canada
Sportspeople from Greater Sudbury